Kanikipa is a monotypic genus of tanaidomorphan malacostracan crustacean found in New Zealand. Kanikipa portobelloensis is the sole species placed within the genus.

References

External links

WORMS

Malacostraca
Monotypic crustacean genera
Marine crustaceans of New Zealand